Huraymila is one of the governorates in Riyadh Region, Saudi Arabia.

References 

Populated places in Riyadh Province